Kirkconnell Correctional Centre, an Australian minimum security prison for males, is located  east of Bathurst, New South Wales.

The Centre is located in the Sunny Corner State Forest and has a fully trained bushfire fighting team comprising both prison staff and inmates.

It was declared a prison under the name "Kirkconnell Afforestation Camp" on 26 November 1958. In September 2011 it was reported that Corrective Services NSW will close the facility in December 2011, as a cost saving measure. All of inmates were relocated to the minimum security wings at Bathurst Correctional Centre and Long Bay. The facility was reopened on 30 July 2015, after a 4 million dollar upgrade.

Notable prisoners
Rodney Adlerdisgraced businessman
Roger Rogerson
Paul Luckman, convicted murderer who is now a woman and goes by the name Nicole Louise Pearce

See also

Punishment in Australia

References

Bathurst, New South Wales
Defunct prisons in Australia
2011 disestablishments in Australia